Trinity Lutheran Seminary at Capital University is an Evangelical Lutheran seminary in Columbus, Ohio.

History
In 1830, the German Theological Seminary of the Ohio Synod, later known as the Evangelical Lutheran Theological Seminary (ELTS), was founded to meet the need for educating pastors in the Ohio region. It generally used the German language in its education and materials for its first few decades. It began in Canton, Ohio, but soon moved to Columbus, the state capital, and located in the suburban neighborhood of Bexley. It was operated by the Evangelical Lutheran Joint Synod of Ohio and Other States (known in short as the Joint Synod of Ohio), which also used the German language. The Joint Synod existed from 1818 until its merger in 1930 with two other smaller German-language regional synods (the Iowa Synod and the Buffalo Synod into the first denomination known as the American Lutheran Church. During these decades, the seminary was run as the theological department of the nearby Capital University, which itself had been part of the seminary until separated into a separate institution in 1850. The seminary was, as a result, occasionally was mistakenly known as "Capital Seminary". In 1960, the American Lutheran Church merged with other Lutheran churches to form The American Lutheran Church (ALC), the second denomination with that name.

With the growing closeness and theological friendships during the mid-20th century between major American Lutheran traditions, the decision was made in 1974 that the Evangelical Lutheran Theological Seminary and nearby Hamma Divinity School should consolidate. Hamma dated to 1845 as the Theological Department of Wittenberg College, in Springfield, Ohio, and was associated with the regional Ohio Synod jurisdiction of the General Synod. The General Synod merged into the United Lutheran Church in America (ULCA) in 1917–1918, and the ULCA in turn merged in 1962 with  several other Lutheran denominations into the Lutheran Church in America (LCA).

The merged institution, renamed as Trinity Lutheran Seminary, opened its doors on September 1, 1978. For the decade from 1978 until the merger creating the Evangelical Lutheran Church in America in 1988, Trinity was owned and operated jointly by the ALC and the LCA. At the time they were two of the three largest Lutheran bodies in the United States.

On January 1, 2018, Trinity once again became a part of the university that it founded in 1850, Capital University, to become Trinity Lutheran Seminary at Capital University.

Academics
Trinity Lutheran Seminary is accredited and its degree programs are approved by the Association of Theological Schools in the United States and Canada and by the Commission on Institutions of Higher Education of the North Central Association of Colleges and Schools.

Trinity offers First Professional degrees of Master of Divinity (M.Div.), Master of Theological Studies (MTS), and Master of Arts in Youth and Family Ministry (MAYFM), and the graduate degree of Master of Sacred Theology (STM).

See also
Nelson Wesley Trout
List of ELCA seminaries
Bexley Hall

References

External links
Official website

Seminaries and theological colleges in Ohio
Universities and colleges in Columbus, Ohio
Bexley, Ohio
Educational institutions established in 1830
Lutheran seminaries
1830 establishments in Ohio
Lutheran buildings and structures in North America